Margaret Leinen (born September 20, 1946) is an American paleoceanographer and paleoclimatologist. In 2013, Leinen was appointed the 11th director of the Scripps Institution of Oceanography, as well as the dean of the School of Marine Sciences at the University of California, San Diego. She founded the Climate Response Fund, a non-profit focused on enabling better understanding, regulation and responsible use of climate engineering research, and served as its president for a time. For two years, Leinen also worked as chief science officer for a startup company in green technology and climate change mitigation.

Education
In 1969 Leinen received her Bachelor of Science degree in Geology from the University of Illinois, a master's in geological oceanography from Oregon State University in 1975, and her doctorate in oceanography in 1980 from the University of Rhode Island.

Honors 
She has been elected fellow of the American Association for the Advancement of Science and of the Geological Society of America. In 2016, she was selected as a U.S. Science Envoy by the United States State Department. In 2020, Leinen was elected to the American Academy of Arts and Sciences and was named a fellow of The Oceanography Society.
 Honorary Member of the AMS (2022)

References

American oceanographers
1946 births
Living people
American women geologists
Fellows of the American Academy of Arts and Sciences
Fellows of the Geological Society of America
Fellows of the American Association for the Advancement of Science
Scripps Institution of Oceanography faculty
University of California, San Diego faculty
University of Rhode Island faculty
Oregon State University alumni
University of Illinois alumni
University of Rhode Island alumni
20th-century American geologists
21st-century American geologists
21st-century American scientists
20th-century American women scientists
21st-century American women scientists
American women academics
Climate change mitigation researchers